Prince Sumyeong was a Korean Royal Prince as the only son of Taejo of Goryeo and Grand Lady Heonmok. From all of his father's wives, just his mother whom held the highest title around the consorts but still below the queens. Although his wife was unknown, but they had a son, Wang Gyu, Prince Hongdeok (왕규 홍덕원군).

References

Korean princes
Year of birth unknown
Year of death unknown
10th-century Korean people